U-Turn GmbH is a German aircraft manufacturer originally based in Villingen-Schwenningen and later in Tuningen. The company specializes in the design and manufacture of paragliders in the form of ready-to-fly aircraft, particularly for aerobatics.

The company was founded by Thomas Vosseler and Ernst Strobl in 2002. One early innovation was offering glider purchase financing through an owners' club.

U-Turn is organized as a Gesellschaft mit beschränkter Haftung (GmbH), a German Limited liability company.

The company's first product was the U-Turn Infinity, an intermediate glider designed for easy handling and safety. By 2016 they had a full line of gliders for all levels of pilots, plus aerobatics, including a two-place aerobatic glider, the U-Turn Twinforce.

Aircraft 
Summary of aircraft built by U-Turn GmbH:
U-Turn Annapurna
U-Turn Blacklight
U-Turn Blackout
U-Turn Emotion
U-Turn Eternity
U-Turn Everest
U-Turn Evolution
U-Turn Infinity
U-Turn Lightning
U-Turn Paramotion
U-Turn Passenger
U-Turn Redout
U-Turn Trinity
U-Turn Twinforce

References

External links

Aircraft manufacturers of Germany
Paragliders
Companies established in 2002
2002 establishments in Germany
German brands